The Sinhala Maha Sabha was a political party in Ceylon, founded by Solomon West Ridgeway Dias Bandaranaike in 1934–5, in order to promote Sinhalese Buddhist culture and community interests. It backed the United National Party from 1946; and left the coalition in 1951 to form the Sri Lanka Freedom Party.

1936 establishments in Ceylon
Defunct political parties in Sri Lanka
Nationalist parties in Sri Lanka
Political parties established in 1936
Political parties in Sri Lanka